The 2016 Diamond Head Classic was a mid-season eight-team college basketball tournament that was played on December 22, 23, and 25 at the Stan Sheriff Center in Honolulu, Hawaii. It was the eighth annual Diamond Head Classic tournament and was part of the 2016-17 NCAA Division I men's basketball season. San Diego State defeated San Francisco to win the tournament championship. Zylan Cheatham was named the tournament's MVP.

Bracket
Source

References

Diamond Head Classic
Diamond Head Classic
Diamond Head Classic